Kaka Mallam Yale (born January 1953) is a Nigerian senator who was elected to represent Borno Central under the platform of the All Nigeria Peoples Party (ANPP) in April 2007.

Background

Kaka Mallam Yale was born in January 1953 in Yale town of Konduga District. In 1982 he studied at the University of Maiduguri for his Diploma in Public Administration (DPA). He obtained a BSc in Political Science from the University of Maiduguri in 1990.

Alhaji Kaka Mallam Yale worked as a local government civil servant in various positions, and was appointed chairman of the Konduga local government by the military regime in 1994. He was elected chairman of the Konduga Local Government from 1999 to 2002. At the state level, he held positions in various departments, including being Sole Administrator Borno Radio Television Corporation.

He was elected to the National Assembly, representing the Konduga, Mafa and Dikwa Federal Constituency as a member of the United Nigeria Congress Party (UNCP) in 1998, but a military takeover prevented his taking his seat. In September 2005, he became  the Borno State Commissioner for Education.

Senate career

Kaka Mallam Yale was elected to the Nigerian Senate for the Borno Central constituency in 2007, running on the All Nigeria People's Party (ANPP). He was appointed to committees on Navy, Interior Affairs, Finance, Establishment & Public Service and Education
As a senator, he did not initiate any bills, but occasionally contributed to debates.
He is not seen as a major voice for his constituents.

In an interview in August 2008 he defended the ANPP, but said it was unfortunate that the ANPP had joined Government of National Unity rather than acting as a true opposition party. 
In December 2008, he criticized the Nigerian National Petroleum Corporation, saying they did not have the technological capacity to locate oil in the Lake Chad basin, and recommended that private firms be given the job.

He was seen as a possible  successor to Borno state Governor, Ali Modu Sheriff in the 2011 elections but failed to achieve this.

References

Living people
People from Borno State
Members of the Senate (Nigeria)
1953 births
United Nigeria Congress Party politicians
All Nigeria Peoples Party politicians
Members of the House of Representatives (Nigeria)
University of Maiduguri alumni
21st-century Nigerian politicians